Agata Kornhauser-Duda (born 2 April 1972) is a Polish former teacher and the current First Lady of Poland. She is married to the president of Poland, Andrzej Duda.

Background and family
Kornhauser was born in Kraków, the child of Julian Kornhauser, a Polish writer, translator and literary critic of Jewish descent, and Alicja Wojna, a Polish philologist. She has one brother, Jakub, a poet and translator.

She has been married to Andrzej Duda since 21 December 1994. Together they have one daughter, Kinga, born in 1995, a law student.

Professional career
She is a German teacher at the Jan III Sobieski High School, Kraków, where she has worked since 1998. She has been described as a demanding but fair and dedicated teacher, and during the presidential campaign only took one day off, vowing to stay with her students until the end of the school year. The school is her husband's alma mater, she herself attended its rival Bartłomiej Nowodworski High School. She wrote her dissertation on the tetralogy of Horst Bienek at the Jagiellonian University, where she and her husband met.

First Lady of Poland
She became the first lady of Poland on 6 August 2015, when her husband became president. On 24 May 2015, he won the second round of the presidential election, achieving 51.55% of the vote against the 48.45% won by his rival, the incumbent Bronisław Komorowski. During the campaign she supported her husband by appearing in party broadcasts. In terms of her own political beliefs, she has been described as more liberal than Andrzej Duda by her brother.

Honours

Foreign honours
: Grand Cordon of the Order of Leopold (13 October 2015)
: Dame Grand Cross of the Royal Norwegian Order of Merit (23 May 2016)
: Grand Cross of the Order of the White Rose of Finland (24 October 2017)

References

1972 births
First Ladies of Poland
Schoolteachers from Kraków
Jagiellonian University alumni
Language teachers
German-language education
Polish people of Jewish descent
Living people